Jean-Amand Lamaze (1833 - 9 September 1906) was a French clergyman and bishop for the Roman Catholic Diocese of Tonga. He was born in Saint-Michel-sur-Meurthe and came to Australia in 1864. He then worked as a missionary in Tonga for 15 years, before being appointed bishop in 1879. He died in 1906 and was buried in Maufaga.

References 

1833 births
1906 deaths
French Roman Catholic bishops
Roman Catholic bishops of Tonga